Citharomangelia planilabroides is a species of sea snail, a marine gastropod mollusk in the family Mangeliidae.

Description
The length of the shell attains 20 mm.

The shell is fusiform, smooth, narrowly, slopingly shouldered; brown with a superior white zone.

The species has been renamed by G.W. Tryon as Mangilia planilabroides as it had been already described in 1846 by L.A. Reeve as Mangilia planilabrum, a name already used by him for Mangilia planilabrum described as Pleurotoma planilabrum Reeve, 1843

Distribution
This marine species occurs off the Philippines

References

External links
  Tucker, J.K. 2004 Catalog of recent and fossil turrids (Mollusca: Gastropoda). Zootaxa 682:1–1295.
 Kilburn R.N. 1992. Turridae (Mollusca: Gastropoda) of southern Africa and Mozambique. Part 6. Subfamily Mangeliinae, section 1. Annals of the Natal Museum, 33: 461–575
 MNHN, Paris: Citharomangelia planilabroides

planilabroides
Gastropods described in 1884